Expeditie Robinson 2009 is the eleventh season of the RTL5 and 2BE reality television series Expeditie Robinson scheduled to be first aired on September 3, 2009. It's the first season hosted by Evi Hanssen and Eddy Zoëy, since Ernst-Paul Hasselbach's death in October 2008.

This season started off with only female contestants. While, the male contestants had to survive the jungle before entering the expedition.

Survivors

 Kamp Noord
 Kamp Zuid
 Junglemissie
 Samensmelting

Future Appearances
Rita Berger returned to compete in Expeditie Robinson: All Stars.

References

External links
Official RTL Expeditie Robinson 2009 Website

Expeditie Robinson seasons
2009 Dutch television seasons
2009 Belgian television seasons